Elizabeth Penrose was an American fashion journalist, and the editor of British Vogue from 1935 to 1939.

In 1934, after Alison Settle was sacked, Penrose, who had been working on American Vogue was sent to London to address the UK magazine's "excessively sprightly nature". Penrose was Condé Nast's "protégé and likely mistress".

In 1939, Penrose went back to the US for a time, but with the Second World War, it was not possible for her to return, so she resumed working for US Vogue instead.

References
 

British Vogue
American columnists
American fashion journalists
American women columnists
American women journalists
Vogue (magazine) editors